Urschel is a surname. Notable people with the surname include:

Charles F. Urschel (1890–1970), American oilman
John Urschel (born 1991), Canadian-born American football player and mathematician

See also
Urschel Laboratories